Shah Mohit (also Romanized as Shāh Moḩīţ) is a village in Fathabad Rural District, in the Central District of Qir and Karzin County, Fars Province, Iran. At the 2006 census, its population was 20, in 4 families.

References 

Populated places in Qir and Karzin County